General Berg may refer to:

Ingvar Berg (1905–1993), Swedish Air Force major general
Johan Berg (1917–1981), Norwegian Army major general
Martin Berg (1905–1969), German Wehrmacht major general
Ole Berg (1890–1968), Norwegian Army lieutenant general
Russell A. Berg (1917–2002), U.S. Air Force brigadier general

See also
Georges Bergé (1909–1997), French Army brigadier general